Nafe Tufui (born 19 September 1968) is a Tongan former rugby union player. He played as scrum-half.

Career
Tufui debuted for Tonga on 24 March 1990, against Fiji in Nuku'alofa. He was also part of the Tonga national team in the 1995 Rugby World Cup, playing two matches in the tournament, against Scotland in Pretoria and  against Ivory Coast in Rustenburg, the latter being his last test cap. 
In 2005, Tufui was part of the Ikale Tahi management team, along with Sione Petelo, Tevita Vaʻenuku and Semi Taupeaafe.

References

External links

1968 births
Living people
Tongan rugby union players
Rugby union scrum-halves
Tonga international rugby union players